Saint Paraskevi may refer to:

People
List of saints named Paraskevi

Churches

Albania
St. Paraskevi's Church, Balldren, Balldren, Lezhë District
St. Paraskevi's Church, Çetë, Çetë, Kavajë District
St. Paraskevi's Church, Hllomo, Hllomo, Gjirokastër District
St. Paraskevi's Church, Hoxharë, Hoxharë, Fier District
St. Paraskevi's Church, Përmet, Përmet, Përmet District
St. Paraskevi's Church, Selckë, Selckë, Gjirokastër District
St. Paraskevi's Church, Valësh, Valësh, Elbasan District

Bulgaria
Church of St Petka of the Saddlers, Sofia
Church of St Petka, Vukovo, Vukovo, Kyustendil Province
Church of Saint Paraskevi, Nesebar, Ravda, Burgas Province

Canada
Saint Petka Serbian Orthodox Church, Lakeshore, Ontario
St. Petka Serbian Orthodox Parish, a Serbian Orthodox Eparchy of Canada, Saskatoon, Saskatchewan

Hungary
Church of Saint Parascheva (17th century), Majs, Hungary

Romania
Metropolitan Cathedral, Iași
Saint Parascheva Church, Desești
Saint Parascheva Church, Iași
Saint Parascheva Church, Poienile Izei

Serbia
Church of St Petka, Belgrade, Serbia
Church of St Petka, Dubica, Bosnia-Herzegovina.

Ukraine
Pyatnytska Church (Chernihiv)
St. Paraskeva Church, Lviv
Saint Paraskevi of Serbia (1820), wooden church with a belfry in Ivano-Frankivsk Oblast, Ukraine

Other places
St. Petka's Church, Šidski Banovci, Croatia
Monastery of Saint Paraskevi (Vikos), a monastery in the Zagori region, Greece
Church of St. Paraskevi, Novgorod, Russia
Büyükdere Ayias Paraskevi Orthodox Church, Büyükdere, Sarıyer, İstanbul Province, Turkey 
Church of St. Paraskevi, Estonia
Church of St. James and St. Paraskevi, The Hague (The Netherlands)

See also
Agia Paraskevi (disambiguation), places and churches in Greece, named after Saint Paraskevi of Rome